The pound per square inch or, more accurately, pound-force per square inch (symbol: lbf/in2; abbreviation: psi) is a unit of pressure or of stress based on avoirdupois units. It is the pressure resulting from a force of one pound-force applied to an area of one square inch. In SI units, 1 psi is approximately equal to 6895 Pa.

The pound per square inch absolute (psia) is used to make it clear that the pressure is relative to a vacuum rather than the ambient atmospheric pressure. The converse is pound per square inch gauge (psig), indicating that the pressure is relative to atmospheric pressure. For example, a bicycle tire pumped up to 65 psig in a local atmospheric pressure at sea level (14.7 psi) will have a pressure of 79.7 psia (14.7 psi + 65 psi). When gauge pressure is referenced to something other than ambient atmospheric pressure, then the unit would be pound per square inch differential (psid).

Multiples 

The kilopound per square inch (ksi) is a scaled unit derived from psi, equivalent to a thousand psi (1000 lbf/in2).

ksi are not widely used for gas pressures. They are mostly used in materials science, where the tensile strength of a material is measured as a large number of psi.

The conversion in SI units is 1 ksi = 6.895 MPa, or 1 MPa = 0.145 ksi.

The megapound per square inch (Mpsi) is another multiple equal to a million psi. It is used in mechanics for the elastic modulus of materials, especially for metals.

The conversion in SI units is 1 Mpsi = 6.895 GPa, or 1 GPa = 0.145 Mpsi.

Magnitude 

 Inch of water: 0.036 psid
 Blood pressure – clinically normal human blood pressure (120/80 mmHg): 2.32 psig/1.55 psig
 Natural gas residential piped in for consumer appliance; 4–6 psig.
 Boost pressure provided by an automotive turbocharger (common): 6–15 psig
 NFL football: 12.5–13.5 psig
 Atmospheric pressure at sea level (standard): 14.7 psia
 Automobile tire overpressure (common): 32 psig
 Bicycle tire overpressure (common): 65 psig
 Workshop or garage air tools: 90 psig
 Air brake (rail) or air brake (road vehicle) reservoir overpressure (common): 90–120 psig
 Road racing bicycle tire overpressure: 120 psig
 Steam locomotive fire tube boiler (UK, 20th century): 150–280 psig
 Union Pacific Big Boy steam locomotive boiler: 300 psig
US Navy steam boiler pressure: 800 psi
 Natural gas pipelines: 800–1000 psig
 Full SCBA (self-contained breathing apparatus) for IDLH (non-fire) atmospheres: 2216 psig
Nuclear reactor primary loop: 2300 psi
 Full SCUBA (self-contained underwater breathing apparatus) tank overpressure (common): 3000 psig
 Full SCBA (self-contained breathing apparatus) for interior firefighting operations: 4500 psig
 Airbus A380 hydraulic system: 5000 psig
 Land Rover Td5 diesel engine fuel injection pressure: 22,500 psi
 Ultimate strength of ASTM A36 steel: 58,000 psi
 Water jet cutter: 40,000–100,000 psig

Conversions 
The conversions to and from SI are computed from exact definitions but result in a repeating decimal. 

As the pascal is a very small unit relative to industrial pressures, the kilopascal is commonly used. 1000 kPa ≈ 145 lbf/in2.

Approximate conversions (rounded to some arbitrary number of digits, except when denoted by "≡") are shown in the following table.

See also 
 Conversion of units: Pressure or mechanical stress
 Pressure: Units

References

External links 
 Pressure measurement primer
 Online pressure conversions

Units of pressure
Customary units of measurement in the United States
Imperial units